In enzymology, a sn-glycerol-3-phosphate 1-galactosyltransferase is an enzyme that catalyzes the chemical reaction

UDP-galactose + sn-glycerol 3-phosphate  UDP + alpha-D-galactosyl-(1,1')-sn-glycerol 3-phosphate

Thus, the two substrates of this enzyme are UDP-galactose and sn-glycerol 3-phosphate, whereas its two products are UDP and alpha-D-galactosyl-(1,1')-sn-glycerol 3-phosphate.

This enzyme belongs to the family of glycosyltransferases, specifically the hexosyltransferases.  The systematic name of this enzyme class is UDP-galactose:sn-glycerol-3-phosphate 1-alpha-D-galactosyltransferase. Other names in common use include isofloridoside-phosphate synthase, UDP-Gal:sn-glycero-3-phosphoric acid 1-alpha-galactosyl-transferase, UDPgalactose:sn-glycerol-3-phosphate alpha-D-galactosyltransferase, uridine diphosphogalactose-glycerol phosphate galactosyltransferase, and glycerol 3-phosphate 1alpha-galactosyltransferase.

References

 
 

EC 2.4.1
Enzymes of unknown structure